My Country, My Parents is a 2021 Chinese four-part anthology drama film, consisting of fourth segments directed by four directors, Wu Jing, Zhang Ziyi, Xu Zheng, and Shen Teng. The four directors also star in their own stories, each covering a different genre and taking place in different periods from the Second Sino-Japanese War in 1942 to a futuristic world in 2050. The film became the third installment in a series that celebrates the founding of the People's Republic of China on 1 October 1949, with two prequels, My People, My Country and My People, My Homeland, released in 2019 and 2020, respectively. The film was released in China on September 30, 2021, to commemorate the 72nd anniversary of the establishment of the People's Republic of China.

Cast

Windriders (directed by Wu Jing)
 Wu Jing as Ma Renxing, commander of Jizhong Cavalry Regiment.
 Leo Wu as Ma Chengfeng, Ma Renxing's son, soldier of Jizhong Cavalry Regiment.
 Zhang Tian'ai as Da Chunzi
 Li Guangjie as Wang Nairong
 Vision Wei as Huang Rui
 Yu Ailei as Song Futing
 Lu Chang'en as a veteran
 Zhang Hengrui as Lü Bu
 Jiang Shui as Lao Rangzi
 Baina Risu as Shan Houzi

Poem (directed by Zhang Ziyi)
 Zhang Ziyi as Yu Kaiying, mother, gunpowder sculptor.
 Huang Xuan as Shi Ruhong, father, rocket engine designer who meets his death in the line of duty.
 Chen Daoming as the elder brother (adult).
 Yuan Jinhui as the elder brother.
 Hai Qing as the younger sister (adult), astronaut.
 Ren Sinuo as the younger sister.
 Li Naiwen as Zhang Xiaoping
 Peng Yuchang as the assistant.
 Geng Le as the chief engineer.
 Du Jiang as the natural father who also meets his death in the line of duty.

AD MAN (directed by Xu Zheng)
 Xu Zheng as Zhao Pingyang, director of Sales Department of Shanghai No. 2 Traditional Chinese Medicine Factory.
 Song Jia as Han Jingya, wife of Zhao Pingyang.
 Zu Feng as Zhao Xiaodong
 Han Haolin as younger Zhao Xiaodong 
 Oho Ou as Xiao Ma, writer and director.
 Tao Hong as Teacher Qian
 Zhang Guoqiang as head of Shanghai No. 2 Traditional Chinese Medicine Factory.
 Fan Yujie as Xiao Mei
 Ni Hongjie as Su Ting, Xiao Mei's mother.
 Jiao Shengxiang as Xiao Pang
 Jia Bing as father of Xiao Pang
 Zhang Yuqi as mother of Xiao Pang
 Ning Li as Master Feng
 Sha Yi
 Hu Ke
 Zhang Jianya as Grandpa Jiang
 Zhang Zhihua as Grandma Jiang
 Ma Shuliang as doctor
 Cao Kefan as director of TV station
 Wan Qian as shop employee
 Zhang Yimou as head of TV station

Go Youth (directed by Shen Teng)
 Shen Teng as Xing Yihao, bionic robot.
 Wu Yuhan as Xiao Xiao
 Hong Lie as younger Xiao Xiao, primary school boy.
 Ma Li as Ma Daiyu, Xiao Xiao's mother.
 Chang Yuan as 4S Store Manager
 Allen as father of Wang Mingtu
 Lamu Yangzi as teacher of Xiao Xiao
 Zhang Xiaofei
 Li Xuejian as an old scientist

Production
My Country, My Parents was funded by China Film Administration. Actors Wu Jing (Wolf Warrior, The Wandering Earth and The Battle at Lake Changjin), Zhang Ziyi (Crouching Tiger, Hidden Dragon), Xu Zheng (Dying to Survive), and Shen Teng (Hi, Mom) acted as directors and leads. Principal photography started in June 2021 and wrapped in July 2021.

Music

Release
My Country, My Parents was released in China on 30 September 2021.

My Country, My Parents released by China Media Capital (CMC) with English subtitles in theaters in over 30 cities across the United States and Canada.

Reception

Box office
My Country, My Parents''' grossed 400 million yuan ($62.22 million) in its first three days of release, by the weekend, the film's accumulated grossed reached 900 million yuan ($140 million). My Country, My Parents earned a total of 1.2 billion yuan ($186.66 million) in its first 12 days of release. As of October 18, My Country, My Parents earned $210 million, ranked second place of Chinese box office in the third week of October, after The Battle at Lake Changjin''.

References

External links
 
 
 
 

2021 films
2020s Mandarin-language films
Chinese drama films
Chinese anthology films
Second Sino-Japanese War films
Films directed by Wu Jing (actor)
Films directed by Xu Zheng
Films shot in Shanghai
Films shot in Guangdong
IMAX films
Robot films
Films about time travel